The Puerto Rican long-nosed bat (Monophyllus plethodon frater) is known only from a skull fragment excavated in the large Cathedral Cave near Morovis, Puerto Rico, by Dr. H. E. Anthony prior to 1917. This species was never observed or documented live. Its extinction is attributed to hurricanes. A fossil fragment was cataloged in London.

References

Monophyllus
Endemic fauna of Puerto Rico
Mammal extinctions since 1500
Extinct animals of the United States
Mammals of Puerto Rico